Carmel O'Shannessy is an Australian linguistics professor at the Australian National University. She is particularly known for her work on language contact in Australia, having described and documented what is now known as Light Warlpiri. Her research combines her expertise in linguistics with a teaching background. She worked as a teacher in Indigenous schools in Australia's Northern Territory in the 1990s. Since 2017, she has been Senior Lecturer at the Australian National University.

Career 
O'Shannessy worked as a bilingual education teacher in the Northern Territory in 1996. She received her PhD from the University of Sydney and the Max Planck Institute for Psycholinguistics in 2006. From 2007-2017, she taught at the University of Michigan, and since 2017 she has taught and supervised students at the Australian National University.

Distinctions 
O'Shannessy works closely with Lajamanu speakers of Warlpiri and Light Warlipiri in her research and much of her work is community-driven.

O'Shannessy's contributions to the study of language acquisition and language contact are notable for their descriptive insights and also for the creative methods and innovative materials she uses to probe language development and contact-induced change. Her research is published in academic outlets and for non-linguists in the communities she works with.

She has received funding for her work on Light Warlpiri and language acquisition in the Northern Territories from the National Science Foundation (USA) and through the Australian Research Council's Future Fellows programme.

References 

Women linguists
Linguists from Australia
Year of birth missing (living people)
Academic staff of the Australian National University
University of Sydney alumni
Australian women writers
Australian writers
Living people